Italy competed at the 1963 Summer Universiade in Porto Alegre, Brazil and won 18 medals.

Medals

Details

References

External links
 Universiade (World University Games)
 WORLD STUDENT GAMES (UNIVERSIADE - MEN)
 WORLD STUDENT GAMES (UNIVERSIADE - WOMEN)

1963
1963 in Italian sport
Italy